The yellowfin surgeonfish or Cuvier's surgeonfish (Acanthurus xanthopterus) is one of several marine fish that change color as they get older. This characteristic confused fish identification, and originally put the young and adults in different species. With the arrival of aquaria and later, coral reef aquaculture, specialists noticed the color transformation. Only recently have  zoologists begun to understand their metamorphosis.

Description
It has eight or 9 dorsal spines, 25-27 dorsal soft rays, three anal spines, 23-25 anal soft rays, and 16-24 anterior and 17-22 posterior gill rakers.

Its body is purplish gray. It has a region of dull yellow in front of its eye. The outer third of its pectoral fin is yellow, the extreme distal part is hyaline. Its dorsal and anal fins are yellowish grey basally and dull yellow distally. Its caudal fin is purplish and the caudal spine is small.

Range and habitat

Its preferred temperatures are 24–28 °C (75–82 °F) at latitudes of 30°N to 30°S. It ranges from East Africa to the Hawaiian Islands and French Polynesia, north to southern Japan, south to the Great Barrier Reef, and New Caledonia, and in the Eastern Pacific, from the lower Gulf of California and Clipperton Island to Panama and the Galapagos Islands.

Juveniles inhabit shallow, protected, turbid inshore waters, while adults prefer deeper areas of protected bays and lagoons.

Feeding
It feeds on diatoms, detritus film of sand, filamentous algae, hydroids, and pieces of fish. It is probably the only surgeonfish that readily takes bait.

References

External links
http://filaman.ifm-geomar.de/summary/SpeciesSummary.php?id=1261
http://www.zanclus.it/mysql/immagini/acanthuridae.php
 

Acanthurus
Fish of Hawaii
Taxa named by Achille Valenciennes
Fish described in 1835